Austrotipula is a genus of true crane fly.

Distribution
New Zealand.

Species
A. hudsoni (Hutton, 1900)

References

Tipulidae
Diptera of New Zealand
Tipuloidea genera